You Are Here is the seventeenth studio album by the British hard rock band UFO, released in 2004 by the German record label SPV/Steamhammer. This is the first album with the new band members, Vinnie Moore and Jason Bonham, who replaced the long-time guitarist Michael Schenker and drummer Aynsley Dunbar.

Track listing

Personnel

Band members
Phil Mogg – vocals
Vinnie Moore – guitars
Paul Raymond – keyboards
Pete Way – bass guitar
Jason Bonham – drums, backing vocals

Production
Tommy Newton – producer, engineer, mixing

References

2004 albums
UFO (band) albums
SPV/Steamhammer albums